Ganewatta is a town in the North Western Province of Sri Lanka.

Transport 

It has a railway station on the Broad gauge system of Sri Lanka Railways.

See also 

 Railway stations in Sri Lanka
 Transport in Sri Lanka

References 

Populated places in North Western Province, Sri Lanka